"With Me" is a song written by Brett James and Troy Verges, and recorded by American country music group Lonestar.  It was released in August 2001 as the second single from their album I'm Already There.  It peaked at number 10 on the U.S. Billboard Hot Country Singles & Tracks chart.

Music video
The music video features video clips from the bands touring, and was directed by Keech Rainwater, who is also one of the members of the band.

Chart positions

References

2001 singles
Lonestar songs
Songs written by Brett James
Song recordings produced by Dann Huff
Songs written by Troy Verges
BNA Records singles
2001 songs